The list of shipwrecks in June 1820 includes ships sunk, wrecked or otherwise lost during June 1820.

1 June

2 June

4 June

6 June

8 June

9 June

14 June

18 June

29 June

Unknown date

References

1820-06